Dogs is a 2016 Romanian drama film directed by Bogdan Mirică. It was screened in the Un Certain Regard section at the 2016 Cannes Film Festival where it won the FIPRESCI Prize. It is Mirică's directorial debut.

The action takes place near Tulcea, in an area of the Danube sector of the Romania–Ukraine border, where groups of smugglers make the law. The city dweller Roman inherits  of land from his recently deceased grandfather. His attempt at selling the property is disrupted by a group of thugs led by the smug, sinister Samir, throwing Roman into a violent arena with only a dilapidated shack as his fortress.

Cast
Dragoș Bucur as Roman
Gheorghe Visu as Hogaș
Vlad Ivanov as Samir
 as Pila
 as Nea Epure
Raluca Aprodu as Ilinca
Cătălin Paraschiv as Agent Ana
 as Sebi Voicu
Teodor Corban as the veterinarian
Andrei Ciopec as Laie
Ela Ionescu as Mara
Marius Bardasan as Nea Toader
Corneliu Cozmei as Nea Terente

Awards
At the 2017 Gopo Awards, Dogs won for Best Lead Actor (Visu), Best Supporting Actor (Ivanov), Best Cinematography (Andrei Butică) (award shared ex aequo with Marius Panduru for Scarred Hearts), Best Sound (Sam Cohen, Sebastian Zselmye, Herve Buirett), Best Score (Codrin Lazăr, Sorin Romanescu), and Best First Feature (Bogdan Mirică).

See also
List of Romanian films of 2016

References

External links

2016 films
2016 drama films
2016 directorial debut films
Romanian drama films
2010s Romanian-language films
Films set in river deltas